The Sierra Leonean Ambassador in Washington, D.C. is the official representative of the Government of in Freetown to the Government of the People's Republic of United States.

List of representatives

See also
Sierra Leone–United States relations

References

 
United States
Sierra Leone